Harel Levy was the winner in 2009, but he chose to not participate this year.
Carsten Ball became the new champion, after he won 6–4, 7–6(2), against Jesse Levine.

Seeds

Draw

Finals

Top half

Bottom half

References
 Main Draw
 Qualifying Draw

Fifth Third Bank Tennis Championships - Singles
2010 MS